Abigail Hawk (born Abigail Diane Gustafson; April 18, 1982) is an American actress known for playing Samantha Bonner in the 1995 television  series Reality Check, Detective Abigail Baker in Blue Bloods (2010–present), and Ellie in Almost Paris. For her performance in Almost Paris, Hawk won the Best Actress award at the 2017 Golden Door Film Festival.

Early life 
 
Born in Chicago, Illinois, Hawk attended the North Springs Charter School of Arts and Sciences, in Sandy Springs, Georgia. While a student, she appeared in the TV series Reality Check. She received a bachelor of fine arts in theatre from the University of Maryland, College Park in 2004.

Career 
At first she found a number of small parts in productions including Law & Order: Special Victims Unit, and Across the Universe.

In 2010, Hawk began her long-running role on Blue Bloods. In that series, she plays Detective 1st Grade Abigail Baker, a member of the Police Commissioner's (Detective) Squad who serves as the primary aide to Police Commissioner Frank Reagan (Tom Selleck). Hawk's character was introduced in the first season of the series (although Detective Baker's name was shown as "Det. Melissa Baker" in the closing credits, it was changed to "Det. Abigail Baker" in subsequent episodes). Since that time, Hawk has appeared in all but a handful of episodes (over 200 through season 11), despite being billed as "Special Guest Star".

She also appeared in Body of Proof, season one, episode three titled "Talking Heads," in 2011.

In 2016, she played the main character, Riley Thomas, in the holiday TV movie A Christmas in Vermont. That same year, she played Ellie in Domenica Cameron-Scorsese's directorial debut Almost Paris, for which she won the "Best Actress" award at the 2017 Golden Door Film Festival.

In October 2017, Hawk was a guest of honor at the Spring Gala of HeartShare Human Services of New York, and received the Linda Dano Award.

Filmography

Film

Television

Other

References

External links
 

1982 births
21st-century American actresses
University of Maryland, College Park alumni
Living people
People from Marietta, Georgia
People from Chicago